Andrei Nikolayevich Lodis (born 3 April 1980) is a Belarusian former professional football player.

Honours
 Russian Second Division Zone East best midfielder: 2005.

External links
 
 Profile at BATE website

1980 births
Living people
Russian footballers
FC Okean Nakhodka players
FC Gornyak Uchaly players
FC SKA-Khabarovsk players
Belarusian expatriate footballers
Expatriate footballers in Russia
FC RUOR Minsk players
FC BATE Borisov players
FC Khimik Svetlogorsk players
Belarusian footballers
FC Sakhalin Yuzhno-Sakhalinsk players
FC Lokomotiv Kaluga players
Association football midfielders
FC Smena Komsomolsk-na-Amure players
Belarusian Premier League players
FC Amur Blagoveshchensk players